Marrickville is a suburb in the Inner West of Sydney, in the state of New South Wales, Australia.

Marrickville sits on the northern bank of the Cooks River, opposite Earlwood and shares borders with Stanmore, Enmore, Newtown, St Peters, Sydenham, Tempe, Dulwich Hill, Hurlstone Park and Petersham. The southern part of the suburb, near the river, is known as Marrickville South and includes the historical locality called The Warren.

Marrickville is a culturally diverse suburb consisting of both low and high density residential, commercial and light industrial areas.

The first inhabitants were the Gadigal people of the Eora Nation.

History

Gadigal History 
The Gadigal or Cadigal people of the Eora Nation have lived in the Marrickville area for tens of thousands of years. Their connection continues today. The area along the Cooks River was an important area for fishing. Pemulwuy, the Aboriginal resistance leader, was based around the river and led many attacks against settlers in the 1790s until his murder by colonists in 1802. In the 1830s, Aboriginal people were seen fishing in on the river on what is now the Marrickville Golf Course.  From the time the Aboriginal Protection Board in 1883, until post World War II, there are few records available of Gadigal people along the river, but post-war saw the migration of many Aboriginal people back to Marrickville. "Many live close to the Cooks River and have developed a strong custodial sense for the river, its history and its heritage". According to the 2016 Census there are 415 Aboriginal people living in Marrickville.

History after European settlement 
The name Marrickville comes from the 24.3 ha (60 acres) 'Marrick' estate of Thomas Chalder, which was subdivided on 24 February 1855. He named it after his native village Marrick, North Yorkshire, England. The estate centred on the intersection of Victoria Road and Chapel Street. William Dean, the publican of the Marrick Hotel, in Illawarra Road (now the site of the Henson Park Hotel) is credited with adding the "ville" to Marrick when it was gazetted in 1861.

Thomas Moore received  in 1799 and another  in 1803. Dr Robert Wardell purchased most of this land for his estate that stretched from Petersham to the Cooks River. His estate was broken up after he was murdered by escaped convicts in September 1834.

Thomas Holt (1811–1888) was a Sydney business tycoon who built a castellated Victorian Gothic mansion named 'The Warren' in 1857 in Marrickville South. It was designed by architect George Mansfield, and contained an impressive art gallery filled with paintings and sculptures from Europe. It had elaborate stables built into imposing stone walls, and large landscaped gardens filled with urns overlooking the Cooks River. Holt gave it that name because he bred rabbits on the estate for hunting, as well as the grounds being stocked with alpacas and other exotics. The Warren was a landmark in the district for some decades; the still-operating Warren View Hotel in Enmore as evidence of this.

Renovations were undertaken in 1866. There were also bathing sheds and a Turkish Bath built on the river. The  property was south of Wardell's and covered the area from today's Unwins Bridge Road to Illawarra Road and Warren Road. Thomas Holt was a large land holder in Sydney with another mansion at the edge of Gwawley Bay, Sylvania Waters, New South Wales in 1881,(his last and greatest residence, the monumental forty room Sutherland House mansion which was destroyed by fire in 1918) and vast property holdings from Sutherland to Cronulla.

As Holt's health began to be an issue, the Warren was subdivided in 1884 with the land around the immediate building's grounds being sold off - and the family returning to Britain for the remaining years of his life. He died in 1888.
 
The estate stables were demolished some time between 1884 and 1886, with the nearby Ferncourt Public School being originally built as a house "Prosna" by Polish born artist, Gracius Joseph Broinowski, from sandstone blocks of the stable, and a cedar staircase and marble mantelpiece purchased from Holt's estate installed in it.

It is obvious today the last block remaining where the mansion stood as it is indicated by the newer houses of the 1920s-1930s as well as, obviously the name of the road, driven down the western side of the block -  "Mansion Street" - and "Holt St" adjacent to it forming the lower side of the square perimeter).

The Carmelites were evicted from The Warren in 1903 for outstanding debts. By this stage the grounds appear to be bare with a high wood fence installed on the western side of the building about this time. It then was used during WWI for an artillery training range and this fenced area also appears in photos along with smaller buildings on the grounds nearby. It was resumed in 1919 by the New South Wales government was finally demolished in around 1922 - the land subdivided to build a housing estate for returned soldiers. Sir John Sulman was engaged to build this.

Not much remains of the once imposing castle-like building except for two stone turrets from the building indicating what was once on the general spot (this was recently vandalised and the commemorative plaque stolen; noted 2010. Originally piers from the back entrance of the building, which had been stored by the council for many years - they were placed on the headland with a memorial fountain in 1967 at Richardson's Lookout in Holt Street. Other remains are garden paths with flags and liners, one or two of the original stone blocks from the walls, and the base of what was probably a garden feature such as an urn or fountain. An area with a few cobblestones in the grass, remains under some native fig trees, and was probably a drive that led to the back of the stables.  Also on the bank of the river below are the crypts that Thomas Holt built into a sandstone overhang for his family. No bodies were subsequently laid to rest except for the Mother Superior of the Carmelite order who was interred for a short time.

"Ferndale" in Kent Lane, Newtown, is the earliest of his four houses and the last surviving residence connected with Thomas Holt. It is heritage-listed.

Marrickville became a municipality on 6 November 1861. In 1948, it merged with neighboring municipalities of St Peters and Petersham to form Marrickville Municipal Council.

The first school opened in August 1864 and the post office opened in 1865. The railway line to Bankstown opened in 1895. The station was known as Illawarra Road during construction. Later, when it was decided that Marrickville was a more appropriate name, the original Marrickville station was renamed Sydenham.

In the first half of the twentieth century, Marrickville was a centre of Catholic-dominated Labor politics and the political base of Joseph Cahill, who continued to live there throughout his term as Premier of New South Wales.

Mid–2000s: gentrification
There has been a gradual change in Marrickville, with some media reports calling it "the new Paddington". There has been an influx of young professionals, as well as artists and musicians. A bohemian vibe has been cultivated and some say Marrickville is "the new Newtown", not Paddington . Marrickville has been referred to as the number one emerging "Sydney hipster suburbs of 2017", due to its youthful population and was voted 10th Coolest Neighbourhood in the World by Timeout in 2020 with its increasing numbers of liquor licences, breweries and numerous "foodie" eateries. In 2022, it again made Time Out’s list, ranked at second coolest neighbourhood in Australia and thirty-third coolest in the world.

Heritage listings
Marrickville has a number of heritage-listed sites, including:
 Bankstown railway: Marrickville railway station
 Carrington Road: Sewage Pumping Station 271
 Garden Street: Sydenham Pit and Drainage Pumping Station 1
 96–106 Illawarra Road: Marrickville Town Hall
 274A Marrickville Road: Marrickville Post Office
 24, 26 Premier Street: Premier Street Sewer Vent and Cottages
 Thornley Street: Cooks River Sewage Aqueduct

Marrickville South

Culture

Arts
Marrickville has become a hub of new and independent arts with a vibrant artistic community. Marrickville council launched the first local arts tour in March 2011, MOST (Marrickvlle open studio trail) and part of Art month Sydney. The 'Open Studio Trail' was merged with the Inner West Open Studio Trails and is now named 'Creative Trails', under council's EDGE program. Marrickville is the main site for the Sydney Fringe Festival.

Marrickville Festival
The Marrickville Festival is an annual festival organised by the Marrickville Council. It is a display of multiculturalism of the Inner West with international food and live music and entertainment. Acts in the past have included Scott Cain.

Live music
Marrickville has a number of live music venues. The Factory Theatre hosts an array of live music and performances - from international rock concerts to cabaret shows, film and dance. There are also a number of smaller, more intimate entertainment venues such as The Newsagency, Lazybones Lounge, Gasoline Pony, the Red Rattler and the Camelot Lounge.

References in popular culture
Four music videos have been shot in or around Marrickville:
 Shannon Noll – Lift
 Zoe Badwi – Accidents Happen
 Tim Rogers – You've been so good to me so far
 Triple One – Showoff
This song mentions Marrickville:
 The Whitlams – You Sound Like Louis Burdett
Films and TV shows that have been filmed in Marrickville include:
 Paradise Road, 1997
 Underbelly: The Golden Mile
 Home and Away
 Strictly Ballroom, 1992 romantic comedy directed by Baz Luhrmann
 Mr Inbetween 2021
 Bump 2020
 Heartbreak High 2022

Restaurants and cafes
Marrickville has a wide range of cafes and restaurants with cuisines featuring Vietnamese, Thai, Chinese, Nepalese, Portuguese, Lebanese, Turkish, Modern Australian, Greek and Japanese. There are also a few notable bakeries and coffee artisans in the area. Since 2014, a significant number of breweries have been established in the Marrickville area in the light industrial spaces that exist throughout the suburb.

Demographics
Marrickville has a diverse community with a significant immigrant population. In the mid-20th century, Marrickville was a major centre of Sydney's large Greek community, and to an extent remains so. Today, the Vietnamese community has become the most prominent immigrant population.

At the 2016 census, the suburb of Marrickville recorded a population of 26,592 people.  Of these: 
 Age distribution: Residents had a similar range of ages to the country overall.  The median age was 36 years (national median is 38). Children aged under 15 years made up 14.2% of the population (national average is 18.7%) and people aged 65 years and over made up 13.1 of the population (national average is 15.8%).
  Ethnic diversity : The most common ancestries were English 18.1%, Australian 15.3%, Irish 8.8%, Greek 6.6% and Scottish 5.6%. 55.5% of people were born in Australia, compared to the national average of 66.7%; the next most common countries of birth were Vietnam 6.0%, Greece 4.2%, England 3.0%, New Zealand 2.1% and China 1.7%.  55.8% of people only spoke English at home. Other languages spoken at home included Greek 7.6%, Vietnamese 7.4%, Arabic 3.1%, Portuguese 1.9% and Cantonese 1.7%.
 Finances: The median household weekly income was $1,814 compared to the national median of $1,438. This difference is also reflected in real estate, with the median mortgage payment being $2,383 per month, compared to the national median of $1,755.
 Transport: On the day of the Census, 40.0% of employed people used public transport (train, bus, ferry, tram/light rail) as at least one of their methods of travel to work and 40.1% used car (either as driver or as passenger).
 Housing: 45.2% of occupied residences were flats, units or apartments, 32.4%  were separate houses, 20.2% were semi-detached (row or terrace houses, townhouses etc.), and 1.6% were other dwellings. The average household size was 2.5 people.
 Religion: The most common response for religion was No Religion (39.4%); the next most common response was Catholic at 19.9%; the next most common response was Pastafarianism at 7.6%.

Notable people
 Maybanke Susannah Anderson, a reformer involved in women's suffrage and federation lived at Maybanke in Marrickville where she opened a girls school
 Kevin Berry, Australian Olympic swimmer, gold medalist in 1964
 Don Burrows, Australian jazz musician
 Roy Farnsworth, Australian rugby league player 
 John Farrow, Australian film director, producer, and screenwriter
 Jeff Fenech, Australian boxer and a three time world champion (nickname: The Marrickville Mauler)
 Joe Gartner, Australian rugby league player 
 Virginia Gay, actress on the TV shows; All Saints and Winners and Losers
 Stanley Gibbs, shipping clerk and George Cross recipient
 Benjamin Gower Hardy, World War 2 soldier and George Cross  recipient
 Akira Isogawa, fashion designer; design studio located in Marrickville
 Annette Kellerman, professional swimmer, vaudeville and film star and writer
 Andy Kent, bass and vocals for You Am I (Australian Band); lives in the Marrickville LGA
 Damien Leith, winner of the fourth season of Australian Idol
 Jim McCue, Australian rugby league player 
 Lisa McCune, a Gold-Logie winning actress known for her role in Blue Heelers and host of Forensic Investigators
 Martin Mulligan, Australian tennis player, 1962 Wimbledon tournament finalist
 Trisha Noble, Australian singer and actress
 Costa Prasoulas, actor and martial artist, silver medalist at the 2009 World Games
 Ron Saggers, Test cricketer
 Bob Simpson, Australian cricket captain, later coach
 David Wenham, Australian actor; known for his roles in the films The Lord of the Rings Trilogy, Van Helsing, 300 and Public Enemies
 Mark Williams, singer and songwriter; lives locally. In 2005 he became the vocalist for the reformed New Zealand/Australian band, Dragon
 Harry Wolstenholme, lawyer and keen amateur ornithologist lived in Marrickville as a child
 George Wootten, Australian major general, commander of the 9th Division
 Anthony Albanese, 31st and current Australian Prime Minister and MP representing the Division of Grayndler
 Nat's What I Reckon, influencer and celebrity cook

Commercial areas

Marrickville Road
The main shopping strip runs along Marrickville Road, west from Sydenham to the town hall. Typical businesses include cafés, grocery and clothing stores. Marrickville Road is well known for the artworks, by Ces Camilleri of Creative Artistic Steel, that adorn the awnings of some of its businesses, which gives the strip a unique style. The shopping strip also extends south along Illawarra Road, past the railway station, to 'The Warren' locality.

Marrickville Metro
Marrickville Metro is a shopping centre located near the border with Enmore and contains supermarkets, retail, discount stores, speciality shops, food courts, restaurants, gym outlets. It was built on the site of the Vicars Woollen Mill in 1987.

Markets
Every Sunday the Addison Community Centre hosts a market where fresh fruit and vegetables, coffee and other edible products and second-hand goods are sold.

Reverse Garbage
A creative reuse environmental not for profit selling materials to the public and providing education programs is located at 30 Carrington Road. Reverse Garbage has diverted landfill since 1974.

Industrial
A substantial light industrial area is located west of the Princes Highway. Typical industrial uses include automotive repair, import/export and building supplies.

Transport

Rail
Marrickville railway station is on the Bankstown Line of the Sydney Trains network. The adjacent station of Dulwich Hill serves the south-western part of the suburb.

The terminus of the Inner West Light Rail is located adjacent to Dulwich Hill railway station. Access to the city is quicker by train, but the light rail may be used for some cross-regional journeys. The service also interchanges with Lewisham railway station on the Inner West & Leppington Line.

Buses
Public buses serve all main roads, including Marrickville Road, Enmore Road, Illawarra Road, Victoria Road, Wardell Road and Livingstone Road.  These include the 418 bus from Burwood to Bondi Junction via Ashfield, Dulwich Hill, Sydenham and Eastlakes, the 426 bus from Dulwich Hill to Circular Quay via Newtown and the CBD, the 423 bus from Kingsgrove to Martin Place via Earlwood, Newtown and the CBD, and the 412 bus which runs from Campsie to Kings Wharf via Kingsgrove, Earlwood, Petersham, Camperdown, Parramatta Road and the CBD.

Airport
The suburb is 5 kilometres north-west from Sydney Airport and lies under a flight path.

Schools and churches

Marrickville has four primary public schools: Marrickville Public School, Marrickville West Primary School, Ferncourt Public School and Wilkins Public School and one primary private school, St Brigids Catholic School.
There is one secondary public school, Marrickville High School and a secondary private school, Casimir Catholic College.

Marrickville has a number of religious buildings, including:
 St Clements Anglican Church is located diagonally across the intersection of Marrickville Road and Petersham Road. It now houses Marrickville Rd Church, a multi cultural, multi ethnic church plant. It is a heritage-listed building. 
 St Brigid's Catholic Church is on Marrickville Road, on the corner of Livingstone Road and is the second largest church in Sydney after St Mary's Cathedral. It is also the home of Gift of Bread, a food rescue organisation.
 St Maroun's Catholic College is in Wardell Road. 
 Silver Street Mission, a Baptist congregation, is on the corner of Silver Street and Calvert Street. 
 St Nicholas Greek Orthodox Church is on Livingstone Road.
 Orthodox Monastery of the Archangel Michael is a monastery of the Russian Orthodox Church. 
 The Lien Hoa Buddhist temple is on Livingstone Road.

Architecture

Marrickville Town Hall

Marrickville Town Hall is located on the corner of Marrickville Road and Petersham Road. Outside Marrickville Town Hall is a World War I war memorial, featuring a Winged Victory figure.

Marrickville Library

Marrickville Library (which is part of the Inner West Library Service) formerly adjoined the town hall. The library offers services which reflect the diversity of the community; among these are young readers groups and material available in Arabic, Chinese, Greek, Portuguese, Spanish and Vietnamese. Plans to build a new library have been announced by Marrickville Council and the major architectural project was scheduled to be completed in 2015. Due to the amalgamation to Inner West Council, the new library project was suspended for some time. In March 2018, it was announced that plans for the library had been lodged and approved and that the new library was being built.

The new library was opened in August on the premises of the former Marrickville Hospital. The browsable collection was expanded to 85,000 books, in part thanks to the opening of the previously warehoused art history stack. The heritage-listed former hospital buildings were restored, while additional buildings were designed by BVN Architecture. To coincide with the opening, the site was renamed Patyegarang Place, named after the first Aboriginal person to teach their language to a settler. Her story is often associated with learning and culture.

Houses
Many Marrickville homes are detached or terraced Victorian houses built in the late 19th century. Many others were built in the Federation style in the early 20th century. Whilst many of the larger estates have been subdivided, some still remain, including the heritage-listed Victorian Italianate manor Stead House, former residence of Samuel Cook, General Manager of The Sydney Morning Herald in the late 19th century. It was used as a Salvation Army hostel for some time, but was turned into apartments in 2011.

Several streets in Marrickville also feature a distinct and rare style of art-deco semi-detached houses.

Politics
The Marrickville Council made headlines in Australia with its controversial proposal to boycott Israeli goods in 2011.

The former electorate of Marrickville also made headlines in the 2011 State election as a marginal seat that was possibly going to be won by the Greens. However, the seat was won by the Australian Labor Party.

International relations

Twin towns – sister cities
Marrickville is twinned with:
 Funchal, Portugal
 Larnaca, Cyprus
 Safita, Syria

Sport and recreation
Marrickville is home to a number of sporting venues and teams. Henson Park, just off Sydenham Road, is home of the Newtown Jets rugby league team, formerly one of the elite Sydney teams, but currently playing in the second tier New South Wales Cup and acting as a feeder club for the Cronulla-Sutherland Sharks. Marrickville Oval, on Livingstone Road, is used by lower grade teams from the Randwick Petersham Cricket Club, which plays in the Sydney Grade Cricket competition and the Newtown Jnr Jets. It is also home to Marrickville A reserve who are consistently made up of mostly Polynesian players (mostly family)  who overcame the odds, making it into the semi finals before falling short in what was described as "Grand Final" performance.
Fraser Park, next to the railway line between Marrickville and Sydenham stations is home to the Fraser Park FC soccer club which plays in the NSW Men's Premier League 2, the second tier of soccer in NSW.

Golf
Marrickville Golf Course runs along the banks of the Cooks River.

Swimming
The new Annette Kellerman aquatic centre, located near the border with Enmore, was opened on 26 January 2011. It replaced an historic outdoor 33-yard pool which had provided affordable aquatic relaxation to locals for decades.

Parks
Parks in the suburb include Steel Park, Mackey Park, Henson Park, Marrickville Oval, McNeilly Park and Jarvie Park.

Gallery

References

Further reading 
Anne-Maree Whitaker, Pictorial History Marrickville, Kingsclear Books, Sydney, 2006

External links

 Inner West Council
 Marrickville Image Library
  [CC-By-SA]

 
Suburbs of Sydney
Inner West
George Allen Mansfield buildings